The United States has maintained diplomatic relations with Panama since its separation from Colombia in 1903. The rank of the U.S. chief of mission to Panama was originally Envoy Extraordinary and Minister Plenipotentiary, but it was upgraded to Ambassador Extraordinary and Plenipotentiary in 1939.

Normal diplomatic relations between the United States and Panama have been interrupted only once, from January 10 to April 3, 1964, in the aftermath of the Martyrs' Day riots over sovereignty.

List of ambassadors
The following is a list of United States ambassadors, or other chiefs of mission, to Panama. The title given by the United States State Department to this position is currently Ambassador Extraordinary and Plenipotentiary.

See also
Panama – United States relations
Foreign relations of Panama
Ambassadors of the United States

References

United States Department of State: Background notes on Panama

External links
 United States Department: Chiefs of Mission for Panama
 United States Department of State: Panama
 United States Embassy in Panama

Panama
Main
United States